Lophopidae is a family of fulgoroid plant-hoppers with most species found in tropical South America and Asia (two genera occur in Africa).

Characteristics
Most members of the family are characterized by the face being longer than wide with at least two lateral ridges (the median ridge/carina may be absent). The hind tibia can bear some spines, two to three (about four may be seen in the Eurybrachyidae). Lateral ocelli are present below the compound eye and slightly in front of it. The wings are broad and held somewhat flat and the wings are often patterned. The nymphs have two long tails and many members have slightly flattened front tibiae.

Subfamilies, tribes and genera

Two subfamilies are currently recognised; the Catalogue of Life and FLOW list:

Lophopinae
Auth.: Stål, 1866
 Tribe Elasmoscelini Melichar, 1915 (Africa, Asia: Japan, Indo-China, Java)
 Elasmoscelis Spinola, 1839
 Tribe Lophopini Stål, 1866 (Africa, Asia)
 Acothrura Melichar, 1915
 Corethrura Hope, 1843
 Katoma Baker, 1925
 Lacusa Stål, 1862
 Lophops Spinola, 1839  - type genus
 Paracorethrura Melichar, 1915
 Pitambara Distant, 1906
 Podoschtroumpfa Soulier-Perkins, 1998
 Pyrilla Stål, 1859
 Sarebasa Distant, 1909
 Serida Walker, 1857

Menoscinae

Auth.: Melichar, 1915; selected genera:
 Tribe Acarnini Baker, 1925 (PNG, Australia)
 Acarna Stål, 1863
 Magia Distant, 1907
 Zophiuma Fennah, 1955
 Tribe Carrioniini Emeljanov, 2013 (Central & South America: monotypic)
 Carrionia Muir, 1931
 Tribe Menoscini Melichar, 1915 (Indo-China, Malesia)
 Menosca Stål, 1870
 Tribe Virgiliini Emeljanov, 2013 (PNG, Philippines)
 Virgilia Stål, 1870

incertae sedis
 †Baninus Szwedo & Wappler, 2006
 Binaluana Soulier-Perkins & Stroinski, 2015 (Philippines)
 †Cintux Stroinski & Szwedo, 2012
 †Gesaris Szwedo, Stroinski & Lin, 2015
 Lacusa orientalis Liang, 2000 (S. China, Laos, Vietnam)
 †Ordralfabetix Szwedo, 2011
 Panegu Soulier-Perkins & Stroinski, 2016 (PNG)
 †Scoparidea Cockerell, 1920
 Silvispina Wang & Soulier-Perkins, 2016

References

External links

 
Auchenorrhyncha families
Fulgoromorpha